Ancylolomia punctistrigellus is a species of moth in the family Crambidae. It is found in Madagascar.

References

Moths described in 1880
Ancylolomia
Moths of Madagascar
Moths of Africa